Bertie Harris (born 1884, date of death unknown) was a South African long-distance runner. He competed in the men's marathon at the 1904 Summer Olympics.

References

1884 births
Year of death missing
Athletes (track and field) at the 1904 Summer Olympics
South African male long-distance runners
South African male marathon runners
Olympic athletes of South Africa
Place of birth missing